Carolina Liar is a Swedish-American alternative rock band. Lead vocalist Chad Wolf is originally from Moncks Corner, South Carolina; other members originate from Stockholm, Sweden.

History

The band is best known for the platinum certified single "Show Me What I'm Looking For" and gold certified "I'm Not Over", from their 2008 major-label debut album, Coming to Terms, produced by Swedish producers Max Martin and Tobias Karlsson.

The song "I'm Not Over" featured in the 2008 film What Happens in Vegas, starring Ashton Kutcher and Cameron Diaz, in the 2008 King of the Hill episode "Cops and Robert", and in the video game UEFA Euro 2008.

On March 3, 2009, the single "Show Me What I'm Looking For" was featured on the iTunes Store as the Free Single of the Week. "Show Me What I'm Looking For" appeared in FOX Sports commercials for the 2009 MLB All-Star Game, as well as MTV's The Hills.

"Show Me What I'm Looking For" and "Open The Door" were featured in commercials for Investigation Discovery's new show, Disappeared, and in promo spots for We TV's The Locator.

In the spring of 2014, an instrumental version of "Show Me What I'm Looking For" was used in an advertising campaign for Swinton Insurance. The TV advert featured the Britain's Got Talent 2013 winners, Attraction.

Carolina Liar was the supporting act on the David Cook/Gavin Degraw 2011 Fall Tour. In 2012, they were the opening act for the Kelly Clarkson/The Fray Tour.

Carolina Liar also played as the opening act for Rob Thomas while he was playing in New York City at the Beacon Theatre and the rest of the stops on his Cradlesong Tour.

Peter Carlsson co-produced Ariana Grande's single titled "Love Me Harder". Johan Carlsson co-wrote and co-produced her single titled "Dangerous Woman".

2019–present 
Over 10 years after its release, YouTuber and media mogul David Dobrik started using "Show Me What I'm Looking For" in his videos, shooting the single shot back up in streams and uses on TikTok, and amassing tens of millions of new views across the platforms. Chad Wolf from Carolina Liar surprised David Dobrik in January 2022 with an acoustic performance on David's VIEWS podcast, with David gifting him a classic Volkswagen bus. Chad Wolf/Carolina Liar has announced he releasing an alternate version of the hit single "Show Me What I'm Looking For," and is currently working on brand new music and new touring plans for 2022.

Band members 
Current members
 Chad Wolf – lead vocals, guitar [2007–present]
 Rickard Göransson – guitar [2007–present]
 Johan Carlsson – keyboards [2007–present]
 Erik Hääger – bass [2007–present]
 Peter Carlsson – drums [2009–present]

Past members
 Jim Almgren Gândara – guitar (2007–2009)
 Max Grahn – drums [2007–2009]

Discography

Studio albums

Singles

Production discography

Johan Carlsson

Peter Carlsson

Rickard Göransson

Appearances 
 Jimmy Kimmel Live! (June 12, 2008)
 90210 (February 3, 2009, US)  (April 27, 2009, UK)
 MTV Spanking New Session (June 23, 2009)
 The Ellen DeGeneres Show (May 6, 2009)
 BalconyTV Hamburg (September 8, 2009)
 Die Oliver Pocher Show (March 12, 2010)
 "BETA Records TV " (November 10, 2009)

References 

Atlantic Records artists
Musical groups established in 2005
Rock music groups from South Carolina